Tellurium tetraiodide (TeI4) is an inorganic chemical compound. It has a tetrameric structure which is different from the tetrameric solid forms of TeCl4 and TeBr4. In TeI4 the Te atoms are octahedrally coordinated and edges of the octahedra are shared.

TeI4 can be prepared from the elements or by reacting Te and iodomethane, CH3I. In the vapour TeI4 dissociates:

TeI4 → TeI2 + I2

It is a conductor when molten, dissociating into the ions TeI3+ and I−. In solvents with donor properties such as  acetonitrile, CH3CN ionic complexes are formed which make the solution conducting:
TeI4 + 2 CH3CN → (CH3CN)2TeI3+ + I−

References

Iodides
Tellurium halides
Tellurium(IV) compounds
Chalcohalides